Long Hard Look is the second solo album from original Foreigner lead vocalist Lou Gramm, released in 1989 (See 1989 in music).

Track listing
"Angel with a Dirty Face" (Gramm, Ina Wolf, Peter Wolf) - 5:14
"Just Between You and Me" (Gramm, Holly Knight) - 4:56
"Broken Dreams" (Gramm, Ina Wolf, Peter Wolf) - 5:54
"True Blue Love" (Gramm, Peter Wolf) - 4:58
"I'll Come Running" (Gramm, Bruce Turgon) - 4:06
"Hangin' on My Hip" (Gramm, Bruce Turgon) - 3:38
"Warmest Rising Sun" (Gramm) - 5:11
"Day One" (Gramm, Bruce Turgon, Peter Wolf) - 3:17
"I'll Know When It's Over" (Gramm, Bruce Turgon) - 4:35
"Tin Soldier" (Ronnie Lane, Steve Marriott) - 3:24

Charts

Production 
 Arranged by Peter Wolf, Lou Gramm and Bruce Turgon.
 Produced by Peter Wolf, except "Tin Soldier" (produced by Peter Wolf and Eric "E.T." Thorngren).
 Recorded by Gonzalo Espinoza and Paul Ericksen, except bass on "Warmest Rising Sun" recorded bu Jules Bowen and Eric Thorngren.
 Additional recording assistance by Carlos Gollisher, Chris Bubacz and Doug Oberkircher.
 Mixed by Gonzalo Espinoza and Peter Wolf, except "I'll Know When It's Over" mixed by Paul Ericksen.  Mixed at 418 Studios.
 Mastered by Stephen Marcussen at Precision Lacquer (Los Angeles, CA).
 Production Coordinator – Carlos Gollisher, assisted by Stephen Nider.
 Art Direction and Design – Bob Defrin
 Photography – Roy Volkmann
 Tracks 1 and 3 published by Stray Notes Music Inc./Colgems-EMI Music Inc./Petwolf Music/Kikiko Music.  Track 2 published by Stray Notes Music Inc./Knighty Knight Music/Colgems-EMI Music Inc.  Track 4 published by Stray Notes Music, Inc./Colgems-EMI Music Inc./Petwolf Music.  Tracks 5, 6 and 9 published by Stray Notes Music Inc./Colgems-EMI Music Inc./Acara Music/WB Music Corp.  Track 7 published by Stray Notes Music Inc./Colgems-EMI Music Inc.  Track 8 published by Stray Notes Music Inc./Colgems-EMI Music/Acara Music/WB Music Corp./Petwolf Music.  Track 10 published by United Artists Music Ltd./EMI Catalog Partnership (all rights for U.S. and Canada controlled by EMI Unart Catalog).

Personnel 
 Lou Gramm – vocals, percussion, backing vocals (1, 3, 6, 7, 8, 10)
 Peter Wolf – keyboards (1-5, 7, 8, 9), backing vocals (1, 8), additional keyboards (10)
 Gary Corbett – keyboards (10)
 Dann Huff – lead guitar (1, 5, 9), rhythm guitar (1, 9)
 Nils Lofgren – electric guitar (2, 8)
 Peter Maunu – electric guitar (2, 3, 4, 7)
 Vivian Campbell – electric guitar (3, 8), lead guitar (6), rhythm guitar (6)
 June Kuramoto – koto (7)
 Bruce Turgon – bass (2-6, 8, 9, 10), rhythm guitar (5, 6, 9, 10), backing vocals (6)
 Pino Palladino – bass (7)
 Ben Gramm – drums, percussion
 Maxi Anderson – backing vocals (3, 7)
 Merry Clayton – backing vocals (3, 7)
 Siedah Garrett – backing vocals (3, 7)
 Phillip Ingram – backing vocals (3, 7)
 Darryl Phinessee – backing vocals (3, 7)
 Ina Wolf – backing vocals (4)
 Reinhold Bilgeri – backing vocals (6)
 Robin Clark – backing vocals (10)
 Lani Groves – backing vocals (10)

Singles
"Just Between You and Me"
"True Blue Love"

Notes 

1989 albums
Lou Gramm albums
Atlantic Records albums
Albums produced by Peter Wolf